Godfrey of Bouillon (1060 – 18 July 1100) was a French nobleman and pre-eminent leader of the First Crusade. First ruler of the Kingdom of Jerusalem from 1099 to 1100, he avoided the title of king, preferring that of prince (princeps) and Advocatus Sancti Sepulchri, or Advocate of the Holy Sepulchre. Second son of Eustace II, Count of Boulogne, Godfrey became Lord of Bouillon in 1076 and in 1087 Emperor Henry IV confirmed him as Duke of Lower Lorraine, a reward for his support during the Great Saxon Revolt.

Along with his brothers Eustace III and Baldwin of Boulogne, Godfrey joined the First Crusade in 1096. He took part in actions at Nicaea, Dorylaeum and Antioch, before playing a key role during the capture of Jerusalem in 1099. When Raymond IV of Toulouse declined the offer to become ruler of the new kingdom, Godfrey accepted the role and secured his kingdom by defeating the Fatimids at Ascalon a month later, bringing the First Crusade to an end. He died in July 1100 and was succeeded by his brother Baldwin as king of Jerusalem.

Early life
Godfrey of Bouillon was born around 1060, second son of Eustace II, Count of Boulogne, and Ida, daughter of the Lotharingian duke Godfrey the Bearded and his first wife, Doda. He was probably born in Boulogne-sur-Mer, although one 13th-century chronicler cites Baisy, a town in what is now Walloon Brabant, Belgium. As second son, he had fewer opportunities than his older brother. However his maternal uncle, Godfrey the Hunchback, died childless and named his nephew, Godfrey of Bouillon, as his heir and next in line to his Duchy of Lower Lorraine. This duchy was an important one at the time, serving as a buffer between the kingdom of France and the German lands. Godfrey claimed descent from Constantine the Great, Heraclius and Charlemagne.

In fact, Lower Lorraine was so important to the Holy Roman Empire that in 1076 Henry IV, then King of the Romans and future emperor (reigned 1084–1105), decided to place it in the hands of his own son and give Godfrey only Bouillon and the Margraviate of Antwerp, allegedly as a test of his loyalty. Godfrey supported Henry even during his struggle with Pope Gregory VII during the Investiture Controversy. Godfrey fought alongside Henry and his forces against Rudolf of Swabia and in Italy when Henry captured Rome itself away from the Pope.

A major test of Godfrey's leadership skills was shown in his battles to defend his inheritance against a significant array of enemies. In 1076 he had succeeded as designated heir to the Lotharingian lands of his uncle, Godfrey the Hunchback, and Godfrey was struggling to maintain control over the lands that Henry IV had not taken away from him. Claims were raised by his aunt Margravine Matilda of Tuscany, cousin Count Albert III of Namur, and Count Theoderic of Veluwe. This coalition was joined by Bishop Theoderic of Verdun, and two minor counts attempting to share in the spoils, Waleran I of Limburg and Arnold I of Chiny.

As these enemies tried to take away portions of his land, Godfrey's brothers, Eustace and Baldwin, both came to his aid. Following these long struggles and proving that he was a loyal subject to Henry IV, Godfrey finally won back his duchy of Lower Lorraine in 1087. Still, Godfrey's influence in the German kingdom would have been minimal if it had not been for his major role in the First Crusade.

First Crusade

In 1095 Pope Urban II called for military action in order to liberate Jerusalem and aid the Byzantine Empire, which in the years since 1071 had lost large swathes of territory to the Seljuk Empire. Godfrey either sold or mortgaged most of his estates to the bishops of Liège and Verdun and used the money to recruit an army of Crusaders. He was joined by his older brother, Eustace, and his younger brother, Baldwin, who had no lands in Europe and was seeking them in the Holy Land. Others did the same, the largest being that raised by Raymond IV, Count of Toulouse, who at 55 was the oldest and most experienced of the Crusader nobles. As a result, he expected to lead the expedition, a claim boosted by the presence of Adhemar of Le Puy, the papal legate who travelled with him. Significant forces also accompanied Bohemond of Taranto, a Norman knight from southern Italy, and Robert II, Count of Flanders.

Following advice provided by Pope Urban, most of these armies set out in mid-summer and headed for Constantinople where they could expect assistance from Emperor Alexios I Komnenos. Each travelled separately, since it was impossible for one region to feed and supply such large numbers on their own; the first to leave in spring 1096 was what became known as the People's Crusade, an army of 20,000 low ranking knights and peasants which journeyed through the Rhineland, then headed for Hungary. Most of those from southern and northern France sailed from Brindisi across the Adriatic Sea, while Godfrey and his two brothers, leading an army from Lorraine reportedly 40,000 strong, set out in August 1096 following the route taken by the People's Crusade. 

Pope Urban II's call for the crusade spurred a wave of antisemitism across Europe, beginning with Rouen in December 1095. In the spring and early summer of 1096, members of the People's Crusade plundered and massacred Jewish communities during the Rhineland massacres. In reference to Godfrey, a Hebrew text known as the Solomon bar Simson Chronicle, apparently written 50 years later, claims "Duke Godfrey, may his bones be ground to dust, ...vowed...to avenge the blood of the crucified one by shedding Jewish blood and completely eradicating any trace of those bearing the name 'Jew'". After being notified of this threat by the Jewish leader in Mainz, Emperor Henry prohibited Godfrey from carrying it out. Simson records that after the Jewish communities in Mainz and Cologne each paid him 500 marks, Godfrey "assured them of his support and promised them peace".   

After the People's Crusade entered Hungary in June, a series of incidents had culminated in a full-scale battle with their hosts and the deaths of over 10,000 Crusaders; as a result, when Godfrey and his troops approached the border in September, it took several days of negotiations before they were allowed in. He finally reached Constantinople in November, shortly after those led by Hugh of Vermandois while others arrived over the next few months. Unlike the limited numbers he had anticipated, by May 1097 Alexios found himself with over 4,000 to 8,000 mounted knights and 25,000 to 55,000 infantry camped on his doorstep. This mattered because the two sides had different goals; Alexius simply wanted help in retaking Byzantine lands lost to the Seljuk Turks, while the Crusaders sought to "liberate" the Holy Land from "infidels"  and establish themselves as rulers. When Alexios demanded an oath of loyalty, Godfrey and most of the Crusaders agreed a modified version in which they promised to restore some lands to the Emperor, Raymond of Toulouse being a notable exception.

Capture of Nicaea and Antioch
In February 1097, Godfrey and his army crossed the Bosporus Straits, where he was joined by Bohemund, Robert of Flanders and Hugh of Vermandois. Accompanied by Byzantine soldiers, in early May the Crusaders invested Nicaea, a city close to Constantinople captured by the Turks in 1085. Godfrey and his troops played a minor role, with Bohemond successfully commanding much of the action but as the Crusaders were about to storm the city, they noticed the Byzantine flag flying from the top of the walls. Wanting to minimise damage to what was an important Byzantine city and suspecting the Crusaders would demand a heavy ransom for handing it over, Alexios had made a separate peace with the Turkish garrison. Although the majority of the Crusader leaders accepted Alexios' right to do so, it was an illustration of the level of mutual suspicion between the two sides.

Godfrey continued to play a minor, but important, role in the battles against the Seljuks until the Crusaders finally reached Jerusalem in 1099. At Dorylaeum in July 1097, he helped relieve the vanguard at Dorylaeum which had been pinned down by a Turkish force under Kilij Arslan I, then sacked their camp. After this battle and during the trek through Asia Minor, some sources suggest that Godfrey was attacked by a bear and received a serious wound which incapacitated him for a time. 

Godfrey also took part in the Siege of Antioch, which began in October 1097 and did not surrender until June 1098 after long and bitter fighting. During the winter, the crusading army came close to starvation and many returned to Europe, while Alexios assumed all was lost at Antioch and failed to provide them with supplies as promised. When the city finally fell, Bohemond claimed it for himself and refused to hand it over to the Emperor citing the Emperor's failure to help the crusaders at Antioch as breaking the oath; after repulsing a Muslim force from Mosul led by Kerbogha, Antioch was secured.

March on Jerusalem
After this victory, the Crusaders were divided over their next course of action. The bishop of Le Puy had died at Antioch. Bohemond decided to remain behind in order to secure his new principality; and Godfrey's younger brother, Baldwin, also decided to stay in the north in the Crusader state he had established at Edessa. Most of the foot soldiers wanted to continue south to Jerusalem, but Raymond IV of Toulouse, by this time the most powerful of the princes, having taken others into his employ, such as Tancred, hesitated to continue the march. After months of waiting, the common people on the crusade forced Raymond to march on to Jerusalem, and Godfrey quickly joined him. As they travelled south into Palestine, the Crusaders faced a new enemy. No longer were the Seljuk Turks the rulers of these lands. Now the Christian army had to deal with armies of North African Muslims called Fatimids, who had adopted the name of the ruling family in Cairo, Egypt. The Fatimids had taken Jerusalem in August 1098. The Crusaders would be battling them for the final prize of the First Crusade in the siege of Jerusalem.

It was in Jerusalem that the legend of Godfrey of Bouillon was born. The army reached the city in June 1099 and built a wooden siege tower (from lumber provided by some Italian sailors who intentionally scrapped their ships) to get over the walls. The major attack took place on July 14 and 15, 1099. Godfrey and some of his knights were the first to take the walls and enter the city. It was an end to three years of fighting by the Crusaders, but they had finally achieved what they had set out to do in 1096—to recapture the Holy Land and, in particular, the city of Jerusalem and its holy sites, such as the Holy Sepulchre, the empty tomb of Jesus Christ. Godfrey endowed the hospital in the Muristan after the First Crusade.

Kingdom of Jerusalem

Once the city was returned to Christian rule, some form of government had to be set up. On 22 July 1099, a council was held in the Church of the Holy Sepulchre and after Raymond of Toulouse had refused the crown, Godfrey agreed to become ruler. However, he preferred Advocate of the Holy Sepulchre to that of king, allegedly refusing to "wear a crown of gold where his Saviour had worn a crown of thorns. Both the meaning and usage of his title is disputed. Some of the original chroniclers used the more ambiguous term princeps, or his previous rank of duke. Later chroniclers who did not participate in the First Crusade suggest he took the title of rex, or king".   

During his short reign, Godfrey had to defend the new kingdom against the Fatimids of Egypt, who were defeated at the Battle of Ascalon in August. He also faced opposition from Dagobert of Pisa, the Latin Patriarch of Jerusalem, who was allied with Tancred. Although the Latins came close to capturing Ascalon, Godfrey's attempts to prevent Raymond of St. Gilles from securing the city for himself meant that the town remained in Muslim hands, destined to be a thorn in the new kingdom's side for years to come.

In 1100, Godfrey was unable to directly expand his new territories through conquest. However, his impressive victory in 1099 and his subsequent campaigning in 1100 meant that he was able to force Acre, Ascalon, Arsuf, Jaffa, and Caesarea to become tributaries. Meanwhile, the struggle with Dagobert continued, although the terms of the conflict are difficult to trace. Dagobert may well have envisaged turning Jerusalem into a fiefdom of the pope, but his full intentions are not clear. Much of the evidence for this comes from William of Tyre, whose account of these events is troublesome; it is only William who tells us that Dagobert forced Godfrey to concede Jerusalem and Jaffa, while other writers such as Albert of Aachen and Ralph of Caen suggest that both Dagobert and his ally Tancred had sworn an oath to Godfrey to accept only one of his brothers or blood relations as his successor. Whatever Dagobert's schemes, they were destined to come to naught. Being at Haifa at the time of Godfrey's death, he could do nothing to stop Godfrey's supporters, led by Warner of Grez, from seizing Jerusalem and demanding that Godfrey's brother Baldwin should succeed to the rule. Dagobert was subsequently forced to crown Baldwin as the first Latin king of Jerusalem on 25 December 1100.

Death

The Arab chronicler Ibn al-Qalanisi reported that "In this year [1099], Godfrey, lord of Jerusalem, appeared before the fortified port of 'Akkā [Acre] and made an assault upon it, but was struck by an arrow, which killed him". While this claim is repeated in other Muslim sources, it does not appear in Christian chronicles; Albert of Aix and Ekkehard of Aura suggest Godfrey fell ill while visiting Caesarea in June 1100 and died in Jerusalem on 18 July. 

Suggestions he was poisoned are unlikely and it is more probable he died from a disease similar to typhoid. Godfrey never married.

Legacy

According to William of Tyre, the later 12th-century chronicler of the Kingdom of Jerusalem, Godfrey was "tall of stature, not extremely so, but still taller than the average man. He was strong beyond compare, with solidly-built limbs and a stalwart chest. His features were pleasing, his beard and hair of medium blond."

As the first ruler of the Kingdom of Jerusalem and one of those who had taken part in its capture, Godfrey was idealized in later accounts. He was depicted as the military leader of the crusade, a legislator who established the assizes of Jerusalem, and in the early 14th century was selected as one of the Nine Worthies, a pantheon of famous warriors thought to epitomise chivalric ideals. In reality, Godfrey was only one of several leaders of the crusade, which also included Raymond IV of Toulouse, Bohemond of Taranto, Robert of Flanders, Stephen of Blois and Baldwin of Boulogne to name a few, along with papal legate Adhemar of Montiel, Bishop of Le Puy. Baldwin I of Jerusalem, Godfrey's younger brother, became the first titled king when he succeeded Godfrey in 1100. The assizes were the result of a gradual development.

Godfrey's role in the crusade was described by various authors, including Raymond of Aguilers and Albert of Aix, anonymous author of the Gesta Francorum. In fiction, he was the hero of the "Crusade cycle", a collection of French chansons de geste dealing with the First Crusade, which connected him to the legend of the Knight of the Swan, most famous today as the storyline of Wagner's opera Lohengrin.

By William of Tyre's time later in the 12th century, Godfrey was already a legend among the descendants of the original crusaders. Godfrey was believed to have possessed immense physical strength; it was said that in Cilicia he wrestled a bear and won, and that he once beheaded a camel with one blow of his sword.

Since the mid-19th century, an equestrian statue of Godfrey of Bouillon has stood in the centre of the Place Royale/Koningsplein in Brussels, Belgium. It was made by Eugène Simonis, and inaugurated on 24 August 1848.

Godfrey is a key figure in the pseudohistorical theories put forth in the books The Holy Blood and the Holy Grail and The Da Vinci Code.

In 2005 Godfrey came in 17th place in the French language Le plus grand Belge, a public vote of national heroes in Belgium. He did not make the 100 greatest Belgians, as voted by the Dutch speakers in De Grootste Belg (the Greatest Belgian).

Literature and music
 In the Paradiso segment of his Divine Comedy, Dante Alighieri sees the spirit of Godfrey, together with Roland's, in the Heaven of Mars with the other "warriors of the faith".
 Pierre Desrey's Genealogie de Godefroi de Buillon, completed in 1499, gives a complete history of the Crusades, starting with the birth of the Chevalier au Cygne (Knight of the Swan), the ancestor of Godfrey, and ending after the accession of Philip IV of France (1268–1314). At least six editions are preserved from the 16th century, published between 1504 and 1580.
 Torquato Tasso made Godfrey, as "Goffredo di Buglione", the hero of his epic poem Jerusalem Delivered.
 A Spanish play entitled "La conquista de Jerusalén por Godofre de Bullón" was written in the mid 1580s and known to have been performed in 1586. The play was discovered in the late 1980s by Stefano Arata. It is attributed to and is now widely accepted to have been written by Miguel de Cervantes. It is an adaptation of Tasso's poem and features Godfrey as an ideal of Christian kingship, possibly as a critical parallel to King Philip II of Spain (1556–98).
 Godfrey is depicted in Georg Friedrich Händel's opera Rinaldo (1711) as Tasso's "Goffredo".
 Godfrey also plays key roles in the following novels:
 The Blue Gonfalon by Margaret Ann Hubbard, which follows Godfrey and his men on their journey to the Holy Land. It is told through the eyes of Bennet, Godfrey's squire.
 The Iron Lance by Stephen R. Lawhead
 Godfrey de Bouillon, Defender of the Holy Sepulchre, by Tom Tozer.
 Godfrey's sword is given satirical mention in Mark Twain's The Innocents Abroad (1869).

Genealogical table

Notes

References

Sources
 
 
 
 
  (abridged version: The First Crusade, Cambridge (1980))
 
 Murray, Alan V., "The Army of Godfrey of Bouillon, 1096–1099: Structure and Dynamics of a Contingent on the First Crusade" (PDF), Revue belge de philologie et d'histoire 70 (2), 1992

Barker, Ernest (1911). "Godfrey of Bouillon". In Chisholm, Hugh (ed.). Encyclopædia Britannica. 12. (11th ed.). Cambridge University Press. pp. 172–173.
 Bréhier, Louis René (1909). "Godfrey of Bouillon". In Catholic Encyclopedia. 6. New York: Robert Appleton Company.

Further reading

Primary sources
 Albert of Aachen (fl. 1100), Historia Ierosolimitana, History of the Journey to Jerusalem, ed. and tr. Susan B. Edgington. Oxford: Oxford Medieval Texts, 2007. The principal source for Godfrey's march to Jerusalem.
 Gesta Francorum, ed. and tr. Rosalind Hill, Gesta Francorum et aliorum Hierosolimitanorum. Oxford, 1967.
 Ralph of Caen, Gesta Tancredi, ed. Bernard S. Bachrach and David S. Bachrach, The Gesta Tancredi of Ralph of Caen: A History of the Normans on the First Crusade. Ashgate Publishing, 2005.
 Fulcher of Chartres, Chronicle, ed. Harold S. Fink and tr. Francis Rita Ryan, Fulcher of Chartres, A History of the Expedition to Jerusalem, 1095–1127. Knoxville: Univ. of Tennessy Press, 1969.
 Raymond of Aguilers, Historia Francorum qui ceperunt Iherusalem, tr. John Hugh Hill and Laurita L. Hill. Philadelphia: American Philosophical Society, 1968.
 Ekkehard of Aura (d. 1126), tr. W. Pflüger, Die Chronik des Ekkehard von Aura. Leipzig, 1893.
 William of Tyre (d. 1186), Historia, ed. R. B. C. Huygens, Willemi Tyrensis Archiepiscopi Chronicon. Corpus Christianorum Continuatio Medievalis 38. Turnholt: Brepols, 1986; tr. E. A. Babcock and A. C. Krey, William of Tyre, A History of Deeds Done Beyond the Sea. Columbia University Press, 1943.

External links 
 

1060s births
1060 births
1100 deaths
11th-century kings of Jerusalem
Christians of the First Crusade
Dukes of Lower Lorraine
Medieval French nobility
French Roman Catholics
House of Boulogne
Lords of Bouillon
Margraves of Antwerp
Kings of Jerusalem
11th-century French people
Burials at the Church of the Holy Sepulchre